Emma Murdoch is a British former competitive figure skater. She is the 1990 British national champion. She placed 15th at the 1990 European Championships and 22nd at the 1990 World Championships.

Competitive highlights

References 

British female single skaters
Living people
Year of birth missing (living people)